Emily Georgiana Kemp (1860–1939) was a British adventurer, artist and writer. She was awarded the Grande Médaille de Vermeil by the French Geographical Society for her 1921 work Chinese Mettle.

Biography
Kemp was a Baptist from a wealthy industrialist family, and one of the first students at Somerville College, Oxford. She continued her studies at the Slade School of Fine Art, University College London.

She travelled in China, Korea, India, Central Asia and the Amazon, sketching, painting and writing, with a focus on the education and welfare of women, and their role in religion.

Kemp was friendly with the theologian Marcus Dods, the explorer Francis Younghusband and Albert Schweitzer. She donated the Somerville College Chapel in the University of Oxford as a "house of prayer for all people" (that is, of all religions). During her travels Kemp developed a strong interest in non-Christian religions. She wished for Somerville College Chapel to be a place where students of all religions could pray. For this reason she encouraged delegates of the 1937 World Congress of Faiths staying in Oxford to use the chapel for their devotions.

Kemp also donated a 19th-century Italian terracotta derived from the 'Annunciation lunette' in the Ospedale degli Innocenti in Florence, by Andrea della Robbia, the subject of which was symbolic to her of the special importance of women in serving God.

Bibliography
The Face of China (1909)
The Face of Manchuria, Korea and Russian Turkestan (1910)
Wanderings in Chinese Turkestan (1914)
Reminiscences of a Sister, S. Florence Edwards, of Taiyüanfu (1920)
Chinese Mettle (1921)
There Followed Him, Women (1927)

References

External links
 
 

1860 births
1939 deaths
British writers
British artists
Alumni of Somerville College, Oxford
Alumni of the Slade School of Fine Art